Hussam al-Din Jarallah  (1884 – 6 March 1954) was a Sunni Muslim leader of the Palestinian people during the British Mandate of Palestine and was the Grand Mufti of Jerusalem from 1948 until his death.

Jarallah was born in Jerusalem and was educated at the al-Azhar University in Cairo, Egypt. He was a leading member of the Supreme Muslim Council during the British Mandate of Palestine. Politically, he was an ally of the Nashashibis and a rival of the al-Husaynis. When Kamil al-Husayni died in 1921, Jarallah had significant support from the ulema in Jerusalem to succeed al-Husayni as Grand Mufti. Indeed, he won the most votes in the election for the post. However, the British High Commissioner Herbert Samuel convinced Jarallah to withdraw, thus allowing al-Husayni's brother Amin to qualify as a candidate, whom Samuel then appointed Grand Mufti of Jerusalem As a consolation, the British appointed Jarallah as the chief qadi and inspector of the Muslim religious courts in Palestine.

After the 1948 Arab–Israeli War, Transjordan (now Jordan) occupied the West Bank, including East Jerusalem and the Old City, an act opposed by the exiled Grand Mufti. On 20 December 1948, King Abdullah I named Jarallah Mufti in place of al-Husayni.

Notes

References
Zvi Elpeleg (1992, David Harvey, trans.). The Grand Mufti : Haj Amin al-Hussaini, Founder of the Palestinian National Movement (London: Frank Cass)

External links
Palestinian Personalities: Jarallah, Hussam Al-din

1884 births
1954 deaths
Al-Azhar University alumni
Grand Muftis of Jerusalem
Palestinian judges
Palestinian politicians
Palestinian Sunni Muslims
Sharia judges
People from Jerusalem
Arabs from the Ottoman Empire